The Robert Johnson House is a historic two-story house in Manti, Utah. It was built with limestone in 1860 by Robert Johnson, an immigrant from England who converted to the Church of Jesus Christ of Latter-day Saints and settled in Utah in 1853. He became a prosperous farmer in Manti. The house has been listed on the National Register of Historic Places since October 14, 1980.

References

		
National Register of Historic Places in Sanpete County, Utah
Houses completed in 1860
1860 establishments in Utah Territory